Lozica may refer to:
 Lozica, Croatia, a village in Croatia
 , a village in Kosovo

See also 
 Boško Lozica, Yugoslav water polo player
 Lozitsa (disambiguation)
 Lozice (disambiguation)